The 2020 United States House of Representatives elections in Arkansas was held on November 3, 2020, to elect the four U.S. representatives from the state of Arkansas, one from each of the state's four congressional districts. The elections coincided with the 2020 U.S. presidential election, as well as other elections to the House of Representatives, elections to the United States Senate, and various state and local elections.

Overview

District
Results of the 2020 United States House of Representatives elections in Arkansas by district:

District 1

The 1st district encompasses northeastern Arkansas, taking in Jonesboro and West Memphis. The incumbent is Republican Rick Crawford, who was re-elected with 68.9% of the vote in 2018.

Republican primary

Candidates

Declared
Rick Crawford, incumbent U.S. Representative

General election

Predictions

Results

District 2

The 2nd district takes in Central Arkansas, including Little Rock and the surrounding exurbs. The incumbent is Republican French Hill, who was re-elected with 52.1% of the vote in 2018.

Republican primary

Candidates

Declared
French Hill, incumbent U.S. Representative

Democratic primary

Candidates

Declared
Joyce Elliott, state senator

Endorsements

General election

Predictions

Polling
Graphical summary

Results

District 3

The 3rd district covers northwestern Arkansas, including Bentonville, Fayetteville, Springdale and Fort Smith. The incumbent is Republican Steve Womack, who was re-elected with 64.7% of the vote in 2018.

Republican primary

Candidates

Declared
Steve Womack, incumbent U.S. Representative

Democratic primary

Candidates

Declared
Celeste Williams, nurse practitioner

Other

Candidates

Declared
Michael Kalagias (Libertarian), candidate for Arkansas's 3rd congressional district in 2018 and candidate for Arkansas House of Representatives in 2014 and 2016

General election

Predictions

Results

District 4

The 4th district encompasses southwestern Arkansas, taking in Camden, Hope, Hot Springs, Magnolia, Pine Bluff, and Texarkana. The incumbent is Republican Bruce Westerman, who was re-elected with 66.7% of the vote in 2018.

Republican primary

Candidates

Declared
Bruce Westerman, incumbent U.S. Representative

Democratic primary

Candidates

Declared
William Hanson, former law professor

Other

Candidates

Declared
Frank Gilbert (Libertarian), former mayor of Tull and former Grant County coroner

General election

Predictions

Results

See also
 2020 Arkansas elections

Notes

Partisan clients

References

External links
 
 
  (State affiliate of the U.S. League of Women Voters)
 

Official campaign websites for 1st district candidates
 Rick Crawford (R) for Congress

Official campaign websites for 2nd district candidates
 Joyce Elliott (D) for Congress 
 French Hill (R) for Congress

Official campaign websites for 3rd district candidates
 Michael Kalagias (L) for Congress
 Celeste Williams (D) for Congress
 Steve Womack (R) for Congress

Official campaign websites for 4th district candidates
 William Hanson (D) for Congress
 Bruce Westerman (R) for Congress

Arkansas
2020
House